The Kanakanavu are an indigenous people of central southern Taiwan. They live in the two villages of Manga and Takanua in Namasia District, Kaohsiung City, Taiwan.

History 
The native Kanakanavu speakers were Taiwanese aboriginals living on the islands. Following the Dutch Colonial Period in the 17th century, Han-Chinese immigration began to dominate the islands population. The village of Takanua is a village assembled by Japanese rulers to relocate various aboriginal groups in order to establish easier dominion over these groups.

On 26 June 2014, the government recognized Kanakanavu as the 16th group of Taiwanese indigenous peoples.

Livelihood 
Japanese occupation left evidence of how the culture functioned. Forest clearance allowed agriculture to be the main facet of society, followed by hunting and fishing. Maize, Rice, Millet, Taro, Sweet Potatoes, beans, and soybeans were the staple crops.

Spirituality 
Kanakanavu practiced a polytheistic nature religion involving offerings, fertility rituals, and shamanism. Headhunting was a common practice until Christianization took over.

See also
 Kanakanavu language
 Taiwanese indigenous peoples

References

Taiwanese indigenous peoples